Hiram Slack may refer to:
 Hiram Slack (Nottinghamshire cricketer) (1808–1853)
 Hiram Slack (North of England cricketer) (1843–1918), nephew of Hiram Slack (Nottinghamshire cricketer)